Minuscule 915 (in the Gregory-Aland numbering), α 382 (von Soden), is a 13th-century Greek minuscule manuscript of the New Testament on parchment. The manuscript has not survived in complete condition.

Description 

The codex contains the text of the Book of Acts, Catholic epistles and Pauline epistles, on 237 parchment leaves (size ).

The text is written in one column per page, and 25 lines per page.

It has a lacuna at the end. Some leaves of the codex were destroyed by fire.

It contains Menologion and lectionary markings at the margin for liturgical reading.

Text 
Kurt Aland the Greek text of the codex did not place in any Category.
It is the only monoglot Greek manuscript known to deliberately place 1 Corinthians 14:34-35 at the end of the chapter.

History 

According to Scrivener and C. R. Gregory the manuscript was written in the 13th century. Currently the manuscript is dated by the INTF to the 13th century.

It was described by Montana, who sent description to Mr. Kelly.

The manuscript was added to the list of New Testament manuscripts by Scrivener (203a) and Gregory (231a). In 1908 Gregory gave the number 915 to it.

It is currently housed in the Biblioteca de El Escorial (T. III. 12) in Escurial.

See also 

 List of New Testament minuscules
 Biblical manuscript
 Textual criticism

References

Further reading

External links 
 

Greek New Testament minuscules
13th-century biblical manuscripts